The Zăvoi is a right tributary of the river Hârtibaciu in Romania. It discharges into the Hârtibaciu in Cornățel.

References

Rivers of Romania
Rivers of Sibiu County